"Pie Jesu" (original Latin: "Pie Iesu" ) is a text from the final couplet of the hymn "Dies irae", and is often included in musical settings of the Requiem Mass as a motet. The phrase means "pious Jesus" in the vocative.

Popular settings
The settings of the Requiem Mass by Luigi Cherubini, Antonin Dvořák, Gabriel Fauré, Maurice Duruflé, John Rutter, Karl Jenkins, Kim André Arnesen and Fredrik Sixten include a "Pie Jesu" as an independent movement. Decidedly, the best known is the "Pie Jesu" from Fauré's Requiem. Camille Saint-Saëns, who died in 1921, said of Fauré's "Pie Jesu": "Just as Mozart's is the only 'Ave verum corpus', this is the only 'Pie Jesu'."

Andrew Lloyd Webber's setting of "Pie Jesu" in his Requiem (1985) has also become well known and has been widely recorded, including by Sarah Brightman, Charlotte Church, Jackie Evancho, Sissel Kyrkjebø, Marie Osmond, Anna Netrebko, and others. Performed by Sarah Brightman and Paul Miles-Kingston, it was a certified Silver hit in the UK in 1985.

In popular culture
The couplet is chanted by a group of flagellant monks as a running gag during the 1975 film Monty Python and the Holy Grail.

Text
The original text, derived from the "Dies irae" sequence, is as follows:

Andrew Lloyd Webber's Requiem text
Andrew Lloyd Webber, in his Requiem, combined the text of the "Pie Jesu" with the version of the "Agnus Dei" from the Tridentine Requiem Mass:

Notes and references 

References

External links
, Philippe Jaroussky, Orchestre de Paris, Paavo Järvi
, Hayley Westenra

Latin-language Christian hymns
Latin religious words and phrases
Songs about Jesus